This is a list of German films of 1931. It included films produced in Germany and German-language films produced elsewhere for release in the German market, often by German subsidiaries of the Hollywood studios.

A–K

L–Z

Documentaries

Short films

References

External links 
IMDB listing for German films made in 1931
filmportal.de listing for films made in 1931

German
Lists of German films
film